Biren Mitra (26 November 1917 – 25 May 1978) was an Indian politician, a leader of the Indian National Congress and the Chief Minister of Odisha from 2 October 1963 to 21 February 1965.

Biren Mitra started his student politics with AISF (Communist Party of India students wing). The Biren Mitra Park located at Sector-11 of CDA in Cuttack has been named in his honour.

References

External links
 Orissa Chief Ministers List

1917 births
1978 deaths
Orissa MLAs 1961–1967
Odisha MLAs 1967–1971
Chief Ministers of Odisha
Deputy chief ministers of Odisha
Chief ministers from Indian National Congress
Bengali Hindus
Indian National Congress politicians from Odisha